Riverdale (formerly, Liberty Settlement) is a census-designated place (CDP) in Fresno County, California, United States. The population was 3,153 at the 2010 census, up from 2,416 at the 2000 census.

Geography

History
The first post office at Riverdale opened in 1875. The place was originally called Liberty Settlement, but was renamed due to its proximity to the Kings River.

Riverdale has a primary school, an elementary school, and a high school.

Demographics

2010
The 2010 United States Census reported that Riverdale had a population of 3,153. The racial makeup of Riverdale was 1,826 (57.9%) White, 33 (1.0%) African American, 59 (1.9%) Native American, 27 (0.9%) Asian, 5 (0.2%) Pacific Islander, 1,051 (33.3%) from other races, and 152 (4.8%) from two or more races. Hispanic or Latino of any race were 2,106 persons (66.8%).

The Census reported that 3,153 people (100% of the population) lived in households, 0 (0%) lived in non-institutionalized group quarters, and 0 (0%) were institutionalized.

There were 845 households, out of which 482 (57.0%) had children under the age of 18 living in them, 552 (65.3%) were opposite-sex married couples living together, 116 (13.7%) had a female householder with no husband present, 46 (5.4%) had a male householder with no wife present.  There were 52 (6.2%) unmarried opposite-sex partnerships, and 2 (0.2%) same-sex married couples or partnerships. 104 households (12.3%) were made up of individuals, and 63 (7.5%) had someone living alone who was 65 years of age or older. The average household size was 3.73.  There were 714 families (84.5% of all households); the average family size was 4.09.

The population was spread out, with 1,111 people (35.2%) under the age of 18, 352 people (11.2%) aged 18 to 24, 814 people (25.8%) aged 25 to 44, 614 people (19.5%) aged 45 to 64, and 262 people (8.3%) who were 65 years of age or older.  The median age was 27.6 years. For every 100 females, there were 99.7 males.  For every 100 females age 18 and over, there were 95.6 males.

The homeowner vacancy rate was 3.4%; the rental vacancy rate was 9.9%.  1,879 people (59.6% of the population) lived in owner-occupied housing units and 1,274 people (40.4%) lived in rental housing units.

2000
As of the census of 2000, there were 2,416 people, 728 households, and 599 families living in the CDP. The racial makeup of the CDP was 51.53% White, 1.24% Black or African American, 1.20% Native American, 1.95% Asian, 0.17% Pacific Islander, 34.85% from other races, and 9.06% from two or more races.  51.08% of the population were Hispanic or Latino of any race.

There were 728 households, out of which 46.6% had children under the age of 18 living with them, 66.9% were married couples living together, 12.2% had a female householder with no husband present, and 17.6% were non-families. 15.4% of all households were made up of individuals, and 7.7% had someone living alone who was 65 years of age or older.  The average household size was 3.31 and the average family size was 3.68.

In the CDP, the population was spread out, with 35.6% under the age of 18, 10.3% from 18 to 24, 24.9% from 25 to 44, 18.5% from 45 to 64, and 10.6% who were 65 years of age or older.  The median age was 28 years. For every 100 females, there were 100.0 males.  For every 100 females age 18 and over, there were 92.0 males.

The median income for a household in the CDP was $29,886, and the median income for a family was $31,667. Males had a median income of $26,458 versus $18,417 for females. The per capita income for the CDP was $12,568.  About 21.0% of families and 26.5% of the population were below the poverty line, including 40.2% of those under age 18 and 5.4% of those age 65 or over.

Famous resident

 Alan Autry, a former Green Bay Packers quarterback, castmember of the television series In the Heat of the Night, and former mayor of Fresno, California,  moved to Riverdale in the mid 1960s.

References

Populated places established in 1875
Census-designated places in Fresno County, California
Census-designated places in California